Hot Springs Historic District in North Carolina is a historic district that was listed on the National Register of Historic Places in 2009.  The National Park Service states:
This district is significant as the historic center of a small mountain community in the northwest corner of Madison County, NC. Once natural warm springs were discovered by settlers in the early nineteenth century, the town became one of the earliest resort communities in the state.

It was listed on the National Register of Historic Places in February, 2009.

The statue was the Highlighted Property of the Week when the National Park Service released its weekly list of February 13, 2009.

References

Geography of Madison County, North Carolina
Historic districts on the National Register of Historic Places in North Carolina
National Register of Historic Places in Madison County, North Carolina